Expansion is a live album released by jazz pianist Dave Burrell. It was recorded during a number of concerts in December 2003 and was released on June 8, 2004 by High Two.

The group that Burrell toured with was referred to as the Full-Blown Trio and included Burrell, Andrew Cyrille (drums) and William Parker (bass).

Reception 

AllMusic calls the album "a lovely record ... by a trio versed in understatement and nuance." Reviewer Thom Jurek in particular comments on Burrell's playing by saying that his "fills between the lyric lines are humorous, warm, and dazzling." The Penguin Guide to Jazz also mention that the three men "gel perfectly" and they provide him with the most flattering context for years."

Track listing
All tracks by Dave Burrell except where noted.

"Expansion" – 4:10
"Double Heartbeat" – 8:14
"Cryin' Out Loud" – 7:43
"They Say It's Wonderful" (Irving Berlin) – 6:52
"About Face" – 5:40
"In the Balance" – 4:38
"Coup d'État" – 3:14

Personnel
Dave Burrell – piano
William Parker – bass, kora
Andrew Cyrille – drums
Shawn Brackbill – session photographer
Flam – mastering
John Rosenberg – engineer

References 

Dave Burrell albums
2004 live albums
Live avant-garde jazz albums
High Two live albums